Notata zumkehri is a moth in the family Erebidae. It was described by Rob de Vos and Henricus Jacobus Gerardus van Mastrigt in 2007. It is found in Papua New Guinea.

Adults are white, but males have dark brown spots at the underside of the wings.

Etymology
The species is named in honour of Piet Zumkehr who discovered the new species during an expedition in 2005.

References

Moths described in 2007
Nudariina